Allan Benny (July 12, 1867, Brooklyn, New York – November 6, 1942, Bayonne, New Jersey) was an American Democratic Party politician from New Jersey who represented the 9th congressional district for one term from 1903 to 1905.

Early life and education
Benny was born in Brooklyn, New York, on July 12, 1867. He attended the public schools of Bayonne, New Jersey. He studied law, was admitted to the bar in 1889 and commenced practice in Bayonne.

Political career
He was a member of the Bayonne city council from 1892-1894. Benny was a member of the New Jersey General Assembly from 1898-1900. He was prosecuting attorney of Bayonne from 1900 to 1903, when he resigned, having been elected to Congress.

Congress
Benny was elected as a Democrat to the Fifty-eighth Congress, serving in office from March 4, 1903, to March 3, 1905, but was an unsuccessful candidate for reelection in 1904 to the Fifty-ninth Congress.

After leaving Congress, he resumed his law practice, and was assistant librarian of the law library in the courthouse at Jersey City until his death.

Death
He died in Bayonne on November 6, 1942, and was interred in Moravian Cemetery on Staten Island.

External links

Allan Benny at The Political Graveyard

1867 births
1942 deaths
Democratic Party members of the New Jersey General Assembly
Politicians from Bayonne, New Jersey
Democratic Party members of the United States House of Representatives from New Jersey
Burials at Moravian Cemetery